Ordinary Riches is the first album by the American rock band Company of Thieves. It was released on February 24, 2009, by Wind-Up Records and debuted at No.162 on the U.S. Billboard 200 chart and No. 5 on the Top Heatseekers chart. The single "Oscar Wilde", despite being moderately successful on American alternative radio, failed to chart on the Billboard Alternative Songs chart.

Track listing

Chart performance

Personnel
Genevieve Schatz – vocals
Marc Walloch – guitar
Mike Ortiz – drums
Dorian Duffy – bass guitar

References

2009 debut albums
Company of Thieves (band) albums
Wind-up Records albums